Consciousness after death is a common theme in society and culture in the context of life after death. Scientific research has established that the physiological functioning of the brain, the cessation of which defines brain death, is closely connected to mental states. However, many believe in some form of life after death, which is a feature of many religions.

Neuroscience
Neuroscience is a large interdisciplinary field founded on the premise that all of behavior and all of the cognitive processes that constitute the mind have their origin in the structure and function of the nervous system, especially in the brain. According to this view, the mind can be regarded as a set of operations carried out by the brain.

Many lines of evidence support this view, for example: 
 Neuroanatomical correlates: In the field of neuroimaging, neuroscientists can use various functional neuroimaging methods to measure an aspect of brain function that correlates with a particular mental state or process.
 Experimental manipulations: Neuroimaging correlational studies cannot determine whether neural activity plays a causal role in the occurrence of mental processes (correlation does not imply causation) and they cannot determine if the neural activity is either necessary or sufficient for such processes to occur. Identification of causation and necessary and sufficient conditions requires explicit experimental manipulation of that activity. If manipulation of brain activity changes consciousness, then a causal role for that brain activity can be inferred. Two of the most common types of manipulation experiments are loss-of-function and gain-of-function experiments. In a loss-of-function (also called "necessity") experiment, a part of the nervous system is diminished or removed in an attempt to determine if it is necessary for a certain process to occur, and in a gain-of-function (also called "sufficiency") experiment, an aspect of the nervous system is increased relative to normal. Manipulations of brain activity can be performed in several ways:
Pharmacological manipulation uses various drugs which alter neural activity by interfering with neurotransmission, resulting in alterations in perception, mood, consciousness, cognition, and behavior. Psychoactive drugs are divided into different groups according to their pharmacological effects; euphoriants which tend to induce feelings of euphoria, stimulants that induce temporary improvements in either mental or physical functions, depressants that depress or reduce arousal or stimulation and hallucinogens which can cause hallucinations, perception anomalies, and other substantial subjective changes in thoughts, emotion, and consciousness.
Electrical and magnetical stimulations uses various electrical methods and techniques like transcranial magnetic stimulation. In a comprehensive review of electrical brain stimulation (EBS) results obtained from the last 100 years neuroscientist Aslihan Selimbeyoglu and neurologist Josef Parvizi compiled a list of many different subjective experiential phenomena and behavioral changes that can be caused by electrical stimulation of the cerebral cortex or subcortical nuclei in awake and conscious human subjects.
Optogenetic manipulation uses light to control neurons which have been genetically sensitised to light.
 Symptoms of brain damage: Examining case studies (like the case of Phineas Gage) and lesion studies are the only sources of knowledge regarding what happens to the mind when the brain is damaged. Various symptoms have been documented. 
 Mental development/brain development correlation: The brain grows and develops in an intricately orchestrated sequence of stages, and this development is correlated with the development of various mental capabilities. Impairments in the growth and development of the brain also result in various neurodevelopmental disorders.

Death

Death is the permanent end of all biological functions that sustain a living organism. It is no longer defined as the cessation of heartbeat (cardiac arrest) and breathing, as CPR and prompt defibrillation can sometimes restart both. 
In modern medicine, when a definition of the moment of death is required, doctors and coroners usually turn to "brain death" or "biological death" to define a person as being dead; brain death being defined as the complete and irreversible loss of brain function (including involuntary activity necessary to sustain life).

Near-death experience (NDE)

A near-death experience (NDE) is a personal experience associated with impending death, encompassing multiple possible sensations. Some explanations from neuroscience hypothesize the NDE to be a hallucinatory state caused by various neurological factors such as cerebral anoxia, hypercarbia, abnormal activity in the temporal lobes and brain damage, though the exact nature of such experiences is not universally agreed upon.

See also

 Biogerontology, the science of biological aging
 Death anxiety
 Disorders of consciousness, including brain death
 Dualism (philosophy of mind)
 Eternal oblivion
 Information-theoretic death
 Life extension
 Neural correlates of consciousness
 No-hiding theorem
 Self
 Senescence, biological aging
 Unconsciousness

References

Further reading
Martin, Michael; Augustine, Keith. (2015). The Myth of an Afterlife: The Case against Life After Death. Rowman & Littlefield. 
Laureys, Steven; Tononi, Giulio. (2009). The Neurology of Consciousness: Cognitive Neuroscience and Neuropathology. Academic Press. 
"What Happens to Consciousness When We Die". Scientific American.

 

Afterlife
Cognitive neuroscience
Consciousness
Consciousness studies
Death
Philosophy of mind